Marco Ezio Fossati (born 5 October 1992) is an Italian professional footballer who plays as a midfielder for Croatian First Football League club Hajduk Split.

Club career

Early career 
Born in Monza, in the Milan metropolitan area, Fossati started playing football as a child with amateur team Cimiano in 2001, before joining A.C. Milan's youth system at the start of the 2002–03 season. Five years later he left for city rival Internazionale, where he went on to spend three seasons, playing for the Allievi (under-17) and Primavera (under-20) sides, as well as making three appearances with the first team in friendly matches. However, in July 2010 Fossati was transferred back to Milan, along with Attila Filkor and Cristian Daminuţă, for a total fee of €7 million. He spent the 2010–11 season playing for Milan's Primavera (under-20) side.

Loan spells (2011–2015) 
At the start of the 2011–12 season Fossati was sent out on loan to Lega Pro Prima Divisione club Latina, making his official debut for the club on 4 September 2011, in a 1–1 draw against Siracusa. He went on to score two goals in 22 league appearances. The following season, Fossati joined Serie B side Ascoli on another loan spell. For the 2013–14 campaign he moved to Bari, another Serie B club, once again on a loan deal.

Cagliari
On 24 June 2015, Fossati joined Cagliari on a three-year contract. After a season he left the club.

Verona
On 8 June 2016, Fossati was signed by Verona on loan, with an obligation to sign. As part of the deal, goalkeeper Rafael moved to opposite direction in a definitive deal. On 20 June 2017, Cagliari confirmed the selling of Fossati to Verona outright.

Monza
On 5 January 2019, he signed a 1.5-year contract with Monza.

Hajduk Split
On 11 February 2021, Fossati was sent on a six-month loan to Croatian First Football League side HNK Hajduk Split. He joined Hajduk Split permanently on 31 August.

International career 
Fossati started his youth international career in a training camp for players born in 1992 and 1993. He then played his first match in Saarland quadrangular tournament. He played all three matches in 2009 U-17 Euro qualifying, and all three matches in the elite round. In the final round Azzurrini lost to Germany in semi-final, but still qualified for 2009 FIFA U-17 World Cup. At the World Junior Cup, he played all five matches. After a call-up to Italy U-19 team in September 2010, he never received a call-up again.

Fossati returned to international teams from 2012 to 2013.

Career statistics

Honours 
Inter
Allievi Nazionali: 2008

Monza
 Serie C Group A: 2019–20 

Hajduk Split
 Croatian Cup: 2021–22

References

External links 
 
 Profile at AIC.football.it 
 International Caps at FIGC.com
 

1992 births
Living people
Sportspeople from Monza
Italian footballers
Association football midfielders
A.C. Milan players
Inter Milan players
Latina Calcio 1932 players
Ascoli Calcio 1898 F.C. players
S.S.C. Bari players
A.C. Perugia Calcio players
Cagliari Calcio players
Hellas Verona F.C. players
A.C. Monza players
HNK Hajduk Split players
Serie B players
Serie C players
Croatian Football League players
Italy under-21 international footballers
Italy youth international footballers
Italian expatriate footballers
Expatriate footballers in Croatia
Italian expatriate sportspeople in Croatia
Footballers from Lombardy